Yajnavalkya Ashram ( Sanskrit : याज्ञवल्क्य आश्रम ) was a gurukul of the Indian philosopher  Yajnavalkya. It is believed that Yajnavalkya got his enlightenment here. It is the place where he wrote many texts of Ancient Indian philosophy. He wrote Shatapatha Brahman, Yajnavalkya Smriti, Brihadaranyaka Upanishad, Yoga Yajnavalkya and many more. Yajnavalkya Ashram is situated at Jagban village of Madhubani district in Mithila region of Bihar.

Description 
It believed that the apabhramsha  of Yajnavalkya is also Jago Rishi ( जागो ऋषि ). Jagban is the association of two words Jag ( जग ) and Van ( वन ) . Yajnavalkya performed his tough penance to the Lord Sun ( Surya Narayan ) for the enlightenment of his forgotten knowledge of Yajurveda for many days here. The Lord Sun became pleased with the tough penance of Yajnavalkya. He appeared to him in the form of enormous light energy and enlightened Yajnavalkya with the lost knowledge of Yajurveda by the help of the Goddess Sarswati. It is believed that the Goddess Sarswati entered in the body of Yajnavalkya in the form of energy to enlighten him with the knowledge of Yajurveda. After that, Yajnavalkya wrote Shukla Yajurveda and taught it to his disciples.  In the ancient Mithila, the pupils of Yajnavalkya came here to study with him. Janaka, the king of Mithila, came here to study Brahma Vidya with Yajnavalkya. Brahma Vidya is the study of Atman ( self or soul ) and God ( Brahman ). Yajnavalkya Ashram was always open to the poor and needy for help and succour. Once there was a famine in the Himalayan valley and Yajnavalkya gave 200 ounces of gold to his disciple Brahmadutta to buy grains and other necessities and to take physicians with him to the affected area and render help. It was the important centre for study ancient Indian Philosophy at the Ancient Mithila University. Yajnavalkya became the head of the philosophical Vidya Parishad of the Ancient Mithila University. It is an important place for tourism of Hindu pilgrims but it is neglected by the local government. This place is associated with the places in Ramayana.

An Ancient Giant Banyan Tree 
In this Ashram there is an very ancient giant Banyan ( Bargad ) tree spread in two acres of land. It is believed that this ancient wonderful tree has relation with the Vedic sage Yajnavalkya. According to the local peoples of the village, there are many interesting stories related to the tree. It has been included as Saving the Guardian of Mithila .

References 

Mithila
Indian philosophy
Ashramas
Ancient Indian philosophy
Tourist attractions in Bihar
Hindu educational institutions